Rhialto the Marvellous is a collection of one essay and three fantasy stories by American writer Jack Vance, first published in 1984 by Brandywyne Books, a special edition three months before the regular (below). It is the fourth and concluding book in the Dying Earth series that Vance inaugurated in 1950. One of the stories was previously published.

Contents

The foreword and first two stories were original to the collection. "Morreion" was originally published in the Lin Carter-edited anthology Flashing Swords! 1 (1973).

"Foreword" 
In which the list of players and the general state of the world in the 21st Aeon are defined.

"The Murthe"
The Sorceress Llorio, also known as the Murthe, has journeyed through time to the 21st Aeon, and is transforming the wizards of that era into women. Rhialto and his colleague, Ildefonse the Preceptor, attempt to foil her plans with the aid of the mysterious time-traveller Lehuster.

"Fader's Waft"
A series of intrigues perpetrated by his colleague Hache-Moncour land Rhialto in the bad graces of his fellow wizards. Whilst he is away, they ransack his manse and appropriate many valuable items in supposed recompense. On his return, Rhialto accuses his colleagues of violating the "Blue Principles", their code of conduct, and insists on examining the original document of the "Principles", stored at Fader's Waft. Upon arrival, Rhialto and Ildefonse discover that the "Principles" have been replaced with a forgery, and Rhialto undertakes a journey back through time to recover the original.

"Morreion"
Rhialto and his associates journey towards the edge of the Universe to seek their erstwhile colleague Morreion, sent away in the distant past to locate the source of the valuable, magic-annulling IOUN stones.

Editions

The special edition preceded by three months the regular hardcover edition (Baen, cover artist Kevin Johnson)

For its predecessor Cugel's Saga, the special edition had followed eight months after the regular hardcover. Fabian and Johnson remained the cover artists but the publishers (or imprints) changed. The special editions were "550 signed and numbered copies" at $30 (vol 3), "Slipcased, signed and limited to 1000 copies" at $40 (vol 4). 

In the articles about both books, the upper-right inset provides bibliographic data for both editions.

References

Sources

External links

Dying Earth
Short story collections by Jack Vance
Fantasy short story collections
1984 short story collections